The 2001 Arab Club Champions Cup edition, called Prince Faisal bin Fahd Cup, was won by Qatari side Al Sadd SC, the hosts. It was the 17th tournament and was held from 28 November to 12 December 2001.

Participants

Preliminary stage

Zone 1 (Gulf Area) 
Qualification from GCC Champions League held in Al Ain on 2001.

Al-Ain qualified but withdrew the tournament, Al-Rayyan replaced it

Zone 2 (Red Sea) 
The qualifying tournament took place in Jeddah.

Al-Ahli Jeddah and Al-Ahli Sana'a' advanced to the final tournament.

Zone 3 (North Africa) 
First Round

Second Round

MC Oran advanced to the final tournament.

Zone 4 (East Region) 
The qualifying tournament took place in Amman. Nejmeh was disqualified from the qualifying tournament because the fifa has frozen the activity of the Lebanese Football Association.

Al-Faisaly and Hutteen advanced to the final tournament.

Final tournament

Venues

Group stage 
The eight teams were drawn into two groups of four. Each group was played on one leg basis. The winners and runners-up of each group advanced to the semi-finals.

Group A

Group B 
Al-Faisaly SC withdrew from the tournament after the first match after contesting the referee falsely, the result was annulled.
Al Rayyan SC replaced Al Ain SC who withdrew from the tournament.

Knock-out stage

Semifinals

Final

Winners

References

External links 
 17th Arab Club Champions Cup 2001 – rsssf.com
 السد يحرز بطولة الأندية العربية الـ17 لأبطال الدوري  – Al Jazeera

2001
2001–02 in Qatari football
2001–02 in Algerian football
2001–02 in Saudi Arabian football
2001–02 in Syrian football
2001–02 in Jordanian football
2001–02 in Tunisian football
2001